NGC 452 is a barred spiral galaxy located in the constellation Pisces. It was discovered in 1827 by Sir John Herschel. It is about 5 arcminutes west of NGC 444.

References

External links 
 

Barred spiral galaxies
Pisces (constellation)
4596
0452
0820
Discoveries by John Herschel
Astronomical objects discovered in 1827